This is an incomplete list of official and unofficial organizations associated with the United States Republican Party.

Americans for a Republican Majority
California Congress of Republicans
California Republican Assembly
Capitol Hill Club
Republican Majority for Choice
Republicans for Choice
College Republicans
Republican Conference of the United States House of Representatives
Republican Conference of the United States Senate
National Republican Congressional Committee
Congressional Hispanic Conference
Congressional Institute
ConservAmerica
Courageous Conservatives PAC
Delegates Unbound
Freedom Caucus
GOPAC
Republican Governors Association
Hollywood Congress of Republicans
Hoover League
Huck PAC
Idaho Federation of Reagan Republicans
International Republican Institute
Republican Jewish Coalition
Kansas Traditional Republican Majority
Republican Leadership Council
Liberty Caucus
Republican National Coalition for Life
Lincoln–Roosevelt League
Log Cabin Republicans
Republican Main Street Partnership
Mainstream Republicans of Washington
National Black Republican Association
Republican National Committee
National Council for a New America
National Federation of Republican Assemblies
National Federation of Republican Women
Physicians' Council for Responsible Reform
Republican Liberty Caucus
Republican National Hispanic Assembly
Republican State Leadership Committee
Republicans Abroad
Republicans for Immigration Reform
Republicans Overseas
RightChange.com
RightNOW Women
Ripon Society
SarahPAC
National Republican Senatorial Committee
Republican Study Committee
Tea Party Caucus
Teen Age Republicans
Texans for a Republican Majority
The Tuesday Group
Republican Unity Coalition
The Wish List
Young Republicans

See also
 List of state parties of the Republican Party (United States)

References